Cerebras Systems is an American artificial intelligence company with offices in Sunnyvale, San Diego, Toronto, Tokyo and Bangalore. Cerebras builds computer systems for complex artificial intelligence deep learning applications.

History 
Cerebras was founded in 2015 by Andrew Feldman, Gary Lauterbach, Michael James, Sean Lie and Jean-Philippe Fricker. These five founders worked together at SeaMicro, which was started in 2007 by Feldman and Lauterbach and was later sold to AMD in 2012 for $334 million.

In May 2016, Cerebras secured $27 million in series A funding led by Benchmark, Foundation Capital and Eclipse Ventures. 

In December 2016, series B funding was led by Coatue Management, followed in January 2017 with series C funding led by VY Capital.

In November 2018, Cerebras closed its series D round with $88 million, making the company a unicorn. Investors in this round included Altimeter, VY Capital, Coatue, Foundation Capital, Benchmark, and Eclipse.

On August 19, 2019, Cerebras announced its Wafer-Scale Engine (WSE).

In November 2019, Cerebras closed its series E round with over $270 million for a valuation of $2.4 billion.

In 2020, the company announced an office in Japan and partnership with Tokyo Electron Devices.

In April 2021, Cerebras announced the CS-2 based on the company's Wafer Scale Engine Two (WSE-2), which has 850,000 cores. In August 2021, the company announced its brain-scale technology that can run a neural network with over 120 trillion connections.

In November 2021, Cerebras announced that it had raised an additional $250 million in Series F funding, valuing the company at over $4 billion. The Series F financing round was led by Alpha Wave Ventures and Abu Dhabi Growth Fund (ADG). To date, the company has raised $720 million in financing.

In August 2022, Cerebras was honored by the Computer History Museum in Mountain View, California. The museum added to its permanent collection and unveiled a new display featuring the WSE-2—the biggest computer chip made so far—marking an "epochal" achievement in the history of fabricating transistors as an integrated part.

In August 2022, Cerebras announced the opening of a new office in Bangalore, India.

Technology 
The Cerebras Wafer Scale Engine (WSE) is a single, wafer-scale integrated circuit processor that includes compute, memory, and interconnect fabric. Scheduling uses a dataflow architecture.

The WSE-1 powers the Cerebras CS-1, the firm's first-generation AI computer. It is a 19-inch rack-mounted appliance designed for AI training and inference workloads in a datacenter. The CS-1 includes one WSE primary processor with 400,000 processing cores, and twelve 100 Gigabit Ethernet connections for data input/output. The WSE-1 has 1.2 trillion transistors, 400,000 compute cores and 18 gigabytes of memory.

In April 2021, Cerebras announced the CS-2 AI system based on the 2nd-generation Wafer Scale Engine (WSE-2), manufactured by the 7 nm process of Taiwan Semiconductor Manufacturing Company (TSMC). It is 26 inches tall and fits in one-third of a standard data center rack. The WSE-2 has 850,000 cores and 2.6 trillion transistors. The WSE-2 expanded on-chip static random-access memory (SRAM) to 40 gigabytes, memory bandwidth to 20 petabytes per second and total fabric bandwidth to 220 petabits per second.

In August 2021, the company announced a system which connects multiple integrated circuits (commonly called chips) into a neural network with many connections. It enables one system to support AI models with more than 120 trillion parameters.

In June 2022, Cerebras set a record for the largest AI models ever trained on one device. Cerebras said that for the first time ever, one CS-2 system with one Cerebras wafer can train models with up to 20 billion parameters. The Cerebras CS-2 system can train multibillion-parameter natural language processing (NLP) models including GPT-3XL 1.3 billion models, GPT-J-6B, GPT-3 13B, and GPT-NeoX 20B with reduced software complexity and infrastructure.

In August 2022, Cerebras announced that its customers can now train Transformer-style natural language AI models with 20x longer sequences than possible using traditional computer hardware, which is expected to lead to breakthroughs in natural language processing (NLP), especially for pharmaceuticals and life sciences.

In September 2022, Cerebras announced that it can patch its chips together to create what would be the largest-ever computing cluster for AI computing. A Wafer-Scale Cluster can connect up to 192 CS-2 AI systems into a cluster, while a cluster of 16 CS-2 AI systems can create a computing system with 13.6 million cores for natural language processing. The key to the new Cerebras Wafer-Scale Cluster is the exclusive use of data parallelism to train, which is the preferred approach for all AI work.

In November 2022, Cerebras unveiled its latest supercomputer, Andromeda, which combines 16 WSE-2 chips into one cluster with 13.5 million AI-optimized cores, delivering up to 1 exaFLOPS of AI computing power, or at least one quintillion (10) operations per second. The entire system uses 500 kilowatts, which is far less power than somewhat-comparable GPU-accelerated supercomputers.

In November 2022, Cerebras announced its partnership with Cirrascale Cloud Services to provide a flat-rate "pay-per-model" compute time for its Cerebras AI Model Studio. Pricing ranges from $2,500 for training "a 1.3-billion-parameter model of GPT-3 in 10 hours" to $2.5 million for training "70-billion-parameter version in 85 days". The service is said to reduce the cost—compared to the similar cloud services on the market—by half while increasing speed up to eight times faster.

Deployments 
Customers are reportedly using Cerebras technologies in the pharmaceutical, life sciences, and energy sectors.

In 2020, GlaxoSmithKline (GSK) began using the Cerebras CS-1 AI system in their London AI hub, for neural network models to accelerate genetic and genomic research and reduce the time taken in drug discovery. The GSK research team was able to increase the complexity of the encoder models they could generate, while reducing training time. Other pharmaceutical industry customers include AstraZeneca, who was able to reduce training time from two weeks on a cluster of GPUs to two days using the Cerebras CS-1 system. GSK and Cerebras recently co-published research in December 2021 on epigenomic language models.

Argonne National Laboratory has been using the CS-2/CS-1 since 2020 in COVID-19 research and cancer tumor research based on the world’s largest cancer treatment database. A series of models running on the CS-1 to predict cancer drug response to tumors achieved speed-ups of many hundreds of times on the CS-1 compared to their GPU baselines.

Cerebras and the National Energy Technology Laboratory (NETL) demonstrated record-breaking performance of Cerebras' CS-1 system on a scientific compute workload in November 2020. The CS-1 was 200 times faster than the Joule Supercomputer on the key workload of Computational Fluid Dynamics. 

The Lawrence Livermore National Lab’s Lassen supercomputer incorporated the CS-1 in both classified and non-classified areas for physics simulations. The Pittsburgh Supercomputing Center (PSC) has also incorporated the CS-1 in their Neocortex supercomputer for dual HPC and AI workloads. EPCC, the supercomputing center of the University of Edinburgh, has also deployed a CS-1 system for AI-based research.

In August 2021, Cerebras announced a partnership with Peptilogics on the development of AI for peptide therapeutics.

In March 2022, Cerebras announced that the Company deployed its CS-2 system in the Houston facilities of TotalEnergies, its first publicly disclosed customer in the energy sector. Cerebras also announced that it has deployed a CS-2 system at nference, a startup that uses natural language processing to analyze massive amounts of biomedical data. The CS-2 will be used to train transformer models that are designed to process information from piles of unstructured medical data to provide fresh insights to doctors and improve patient recovery and treatment.

In May 2022, Cerebras announced that the National Center for Supercomputing Applications (NCSA) has deployed the Cerebras CS-2 system in their HOLL-I supercomputer.  They also announced that the Leibniz Supercomputing Centre (LRZ) in Germany plans to deploy a new supercomputer featuring the CS-2 system along with the HPE Superdome Flex server. The new supercomputing system is expected to be delivered to LRZ this summer. This will be the first CS-2 system deployment in Europe.

In October 2022, it was announced that the U.S. National Nuclear Security Administration would sponsor a study to investigate using Cerebras' CS-2 in nuclear stockpile stewardship computing. The multi-year contract will be executed through Sandia National Laboratories, Lawrence Livermore National Lab, and Los Alamos National Laboratory.

In November 2022, Cerebras and the National Energy Technology Laboratory (NETL) saw record-breaking performance on the scientific compute workload of forming and solving field equations. Cerebras demonstrated that its CS-2 system was as much as 470 times faster than NETL's Joule Supercomputer in field equation modeling.

The 2022 Gordon Bell Special Prize Winner for HPC-Based COVID-19 Research, which honors outstanding research achievement towards the understanding of the COVID-19 pandemic through the use of high-performance computing, used Cerebras' CS-2 system to conduct this award-winning research to transform large language models to analyze COVID-19 variants. The paper was authored by a 34-person team from Argonne National Laboratory, California Institute of Technology, Harvard University, Northern Illinois University, Technical University of Munich, University of Chicago, University of Illinois Chicago, Nvidia, and Cerebras. ANL noted that using the CS-2 Wafer-Scale Engine cluster, the team was able to achieve convergence when training on the full SARS-CoV-2 genomes in less than a day.

In November 2022, Cerebras announced a partnership with AI content platform Jasper AI to help accelerate the adoption and accuracy of generative AI. Jasper will use Cerebras' Andromeda AI supercomputer to train its computationally-intensive models in a "fraction of the time."

In February 2023, Cerebras announced that it had carried out, for the first time ever, the simulation of a high-resolution convection workload at near real-time rates using the WSE Field-equation application programming interface developed by the National Energy Technology Laboratory and carried out by the Neocortex AI supercomputer, powered by multiple CS-2 AI systems, at the Pittsburgh Supercomputing Center. Cerebras said the WFA API powered by its CS-2 system simulated Rayleigh-Bénard convection about 470 times faster than what was possible on NETL’s existing Joule Supercomputer, which is powered by traditional GPUs.

See also 
 Wafer-scale integration
 Wafer-level packaging
 Semiconductor device fabrication 
 Transistor count
 Deep learning processor

References

External links 
 
 Cerebras' presentation at Hot Chips 34 (2022)

Computer companies of the United States
Companies based in California
Companies based in Sunnyvale, California
Companies based in Silicon Valley
Semiconductor companies of the United States
Fabless semiconductor companies
Electronics companies established in 2016
Electronics companies of the United States